The R768 road is a regional road in Ireland which connects J7 (Bray South) of the N11 to the junction of the R761 at Irishtown, Bray. The road is commonly known as the Southern Cross or the Southern Bypass, though it is officially known as the Southern Ring Road.

Route
The route begins at the Kilcroney Interchange (J7 Bray South/Greystones North), which is one of the busiest junctions in the country. The route crosses the N11 and meets the Ram Roundabout. The R768 then travels east through the majority of Bray's southern suburbs, including Ballywaltrim and Kilruddery. The route terminates in Irishtown at the roundabout with the R761.

See also
Roads in Ireland
National primary road

References
Roads Act 1993 (Classification of Regional Roads) Order 2006 – Department of Transport

Regional roads in the Republic of Ireland
Roads in County Wicklow